, also referred to as CKB, is a Japanese musical group formed in 1997 by its lead vocalist, writer and composer Ken Yokoyama. The band first came together in 1991 under the name "CK's", with a four-member lineup: Ken Yokoyama, Keiichi Hiroishi, Masao Onose and Shinya Horaguchi. This incarnation of the group was centred on a 15-man instrumental and vocal group. In 1997, Keiichi Nakanishi became the fifth member and the group's name was changed to "Crazy Ken Band".

The band made its debut in June 1998 with the album Punch! Punch! Punch!. In 2000, support member Toraji Shingū became a full member of the band. The group's first single, "Nikutai Kankei", was released in June 2001. In 2003, HMV Japan ranked the band at #98 in their "Top 100 Japanese pops Artists". In 2005, their song "Tiger & Dragon" was used as the theme song of the critically acclaimed TBS drama of the same name.

The group's first compilation album, CKBB - Oldies But Goodies was released on March 3, 2004, reaching a chart position of #9 and remaining on the charts for forty-nine weeks. A set of compilation albums, Best Tsuru and Best Kame, their third and fourth compilation albums respectively, were released on February 24, 2010. Both were successful; Tsuru charted at #10 on the Oricon weekly chart, selling 13,323 copies in its first week, while Kame charted at #11, selling 12,158 copies in its first week.

"December 17" was later featured on Best Tsuru.

Members
  - lead vocalist, chorus, writer, composer, arrangement and keyboardist
  - electric guitar and chorus
  - electric guitar and keyboard
  - saxophone, flute
  - bass
  - drums, percussion, bandmaster
  - keyboard, arrangement
  - vocals, chorus
  - vocals, chorus
  - trombone, flute
  - trumpet, flugelhorn
  - percussion

Discography

Singles

Studio albums

12-inch albums

Digital albums

Live albums

Compilation albums

External links
 Official website

References

Japanese rock music groups
Universal Music Japan artists